In Greek mythology, Hieromneme was a minor naiad of Asia Minor. Her means 'memory of the holy rites' which came from hieros and mnêma.

Family 
Hieromneme was a daughter of the river-god Simoïs, and the wife of Assaracus, by whom she bore Capys. Alternately, Hieromneme was the daughter-in-law of Assaracus, wife of Capys and mother of Anchises. In some accounts, Clytodora was called the wife of Assaracus while Themiste was regarded as the consort of Capys.

Family tree

Notes

Naiads

References 

 Apollodorus, The Library with an English Translation by Sir James George Frazer, F.B.A., F.R.S. in 2 Volumes, Cambridge, MA, Harvard University Press; London, William Heinemann Ltd. 1921. ISBN 0-674-99135-4. Online version at the Perseus Digital Library. Greek text available from the same website.
 Dionysus of Halicarnassus, Roman Antiquities. English translation by Earnest Cary in the Loeb Classical Library, 7 volumes. Harvard University Press, 1937–1950. Online version at Bill Thayer's Web Site
 Dionysius of Halicarnassus, Antiquitatum Romanarum quae supersunt, Vol I-IV. . Karl Jacoby. In Aedibus B.G. Teubneri. Leipzig. 1885. Greek text available at the Perseus Digital Library.

Nymphs
Children of Potamoi
Queens in Greek mythology